The following outline is provided as an overview of and topical guide to the human self:

Self – individuality, from one's own perspective. To each person, self is that person. Oneself can be a subject of philosophy, psychology and developmental psychology; religion and spirituality, social science and neuroscience.

In general 

 Human
 Human condition
 Individuality (selfhood) – state or quality of being an individual; particularly of being a person separate from other persons and possessing his or her own needs or goals, rights and responsibilities. The exact definition of an individual is important in the fields of biology, law, and philosophy.
 Person – being that has certain capacities or attributes such as reason, morality, consciousness or self-consciousness, and being a part of a culturally established form of social relations such as kinship, ownership of property, or legal responsibility.
 Personhood – status of being a person. Defining personhood is a controversial topic in philosophy and law and is closely tied with legal and political concepts of citizenship, equality, and liberty. According to law, only a natural person or legal personality has rights, protections, privileges, responsibilities, and legal liability.
 Philosophy of self
 Psychology of self
 Religious views on the self

Components of self 

 Body
 Brain / Mind / Intelligence
 Character
 Experience
 Sentience
 Gender
 Personal identity (see below)
 Personality (see below)
 Self-concept
 Self-awareness
 Self-consciousness
 Self-control
 Self-esteem
 Self-guilt
 Self-knowledge
 Self-perception
 Self-realization
 Self-worth
 Skill
 Wisdom

Personal identity 

Personal identity
 Identity (philosophy)
Identity (social science)
Identity formation
Cultural identity
 Moral identity
Social identity
 Personally identifiable information
 Self-identity
 Self-image
 Self-schema

Personality 

Personality

Personality traits 

Personality trait

Big Five personality traits 

Big Five personality traits
 Extraversion and introversion
 Agreeableness
 Conscientiousness
 Neuroticism / Emotional stability
 Openness to experience

Virtues 

Virtue – characteristic of a person which supports individual moral excellence and collective well-being. Such characteristics are valued as a principle and recognized as a good way to be. This list is necessarily incomplete.
 Virtues of self-control
Temperance - self-control regarding pleasure
Good temper - self-control regarding anger
Ambition - self-control regarding one's goals
Curiosity - self-control regarding knowledge
Frugality  (also Thrift) - self-control regarding the material lifestyle
Industry - self-control regarding play, recreation and entertainment
Contentment - self-control regarding one's possessions and the possessions of others; acknowledgement and satisfaction of maintaining one's current capacity
Continence - self-control regarding bodily functions
Chastity - self-control regarding sexual activities
 Virtues of self-efficacy
Courage - willingness to do the right thing in the face of danger, pain, significant harm or risk
Patience - ability to delay or wait for what is desired
Perseverance - ability to work steadily despite setbacks or difficulties
Persistence - ability to continue or repeat a task in order to achieve a goal
 Virtues of regard
Fair-mindedness - concern that all get their due (including oneself) in cooperative arrangements of mutual benefit
Tolerance - willingness to allow others to lead a life based on a certain set of beliefs differing from one's own
Truthfulness/Honesty - telling someone what you know to be true in the context of a direct inquiry
 Virtues of respect
Respect - regard for the worth of others
Self respect - regard for the worth of oneself
Humility - respect for one's limitations
 Social virtues
 Politeness
 Charisma
 Leadership
 Unpretentiousness
 Friendliness
 Sportsmanship
 Cleanliness
 Virtues of kindness
 Kindness - regard for those who are within an individual's ability to help
 Generosity - giving to those in need
 Forgiveness - willingness to overlook transgressions made against you
 Compassion - empathy and understanding for the suffering of others
 Specific
 Epistemic
 Intellectual
 Nine Noble Virtues
 Prussian
 Seven virtues
 Spanish chivalry
 Other
 List of emotions
Acceptance
Accountability
Altruism
Aptitude
Assertiveness
Attention
Autonomy
Awareness
Balance
Benevolence
Calmness
Candor
Cautiousness
Charity
Christian Charity
Chivalry
Citizenship
Commitment
Confidence
Conscientiousness
Consideration
Cooperativeness
Courteousness
Creativity
Dependability
Detachment
Determination
Diligence
Discernment
Discipline
Empathy
Endurance
Equanimity
Fairness
Faithfulness, Fidelity
Freedom
Flexibility
Flourishing
Foresight
Gentleness
Goodness
Gratitude
Helpfulness
Honor
Happiness
Hope
Hospitality
Humanity
Humor
Impartiality
Independence
Individualism
Integrity
Interest
Interpersonal attraction
Intuition
Inventiveness
Justice
Knowledge
Liberty
Logic
Loyalty
Meekness
Mercy
Mindfulness
Moderation
Modesty
Morality
Nonviolence
Obedience
Openness
Optimism
Order
Originality
Peacefulness
Perseverance
Philomathy
Piety
Potential
Prosperity
Prudence
Purity
Rationality
Reason
Readiness
Remembrance
Resilience
Respectfulness
Responsibility
Restraint
Self-reliance
Sensitivity
Service
Sharing
Sincerity
Silence
Social skills
Solidarity
Spirituality
Stability
Subsidiarity
Tactfulness
Tenacity
Thoughtfulness
Tranquility
Trustworthiness
Understanding
Uniqueness
Unity
Vigilance
Wealth
Wisdom

Vices

 Anger – emotional response related to one's psychological interpretation of having been threatened. Often it indicates when one's basic boundaries are violated. Some have a learned tendency to react to anger through retaliation. Anger may be utilized effectively when utilized to set boundaries or escape from dangerous situations.
 Jealousy – emotion, and the word typically refers to the negative thoughts and feelings of insecurity, fear, and anxiety over an anticipated loss of something of great personal value, particularly in reference to a human connection. Jealousy often consists of a combination of emotions such as anger, resentment, inadequacy, helplessness and disgust.
 Laziness – disinclination to activity or exertion despite having the ability to do so. It is often used as a pejorative; related terms for a person seen to be lazy include couch potato, slacker, and bludger.
 Selfishness –
 Seven Deadly Sins
 Lust – emotion or feeling of intense desire in the body. The lust can take any form such as the lust for knowledge, the lust for sex or the lust for power. It can take such mundane forms as the lust for food as distinct from the need for food.
 Gluttony – over-indulgence and over-consumption of food, drink, or wealth items to the point of extravagance or waste. In some Christian denominations, it is considered one of the seven deadly sins—a misplaced desire of food or its withholding from the needy.
 Greed – also known as avarice, cupidity, or covetousness, is the inordinate desire to possess wealth, goods, or objects of abstract value with the intent to keep it for one's self, far beyond the dictates of basic survival and comfort. It is applied to a markedly high desire for and pursuit of wealth, status, and power. See also, Greed (deadly sin).
 Sloth – spiritual or emotional apathy, neglecting what God has spoken, and being physically and emotionally inactive. It can also be either an outright refusal or merely a carelessness in the performance of one's obligations, especially spiritual, moral or legal obligations. Sloth can also indicate a wasting due to lack of use, concerning a person, place, thing, skill, or intangible ideal that would require maintenance, refinement, or support to continue to exist.
 Wrath – also known as "rage", may be described as inordinate and uncontrolled feelings of hatred and anger. Wrath, in its purest form, presents with self-destructiveness, violence, and hate that may provoke feuds that can go on for centuries. Wrath may persist long after the person who did another a grievous wrong is dead. Feelings of anger can manifest in different ways, including impatience, revenge, and self-destructive behavior, such as drug abuse or suicide.
 Envy – emotion which "occurs when a person lacks another's superior quality, achievement, or possession and either desires it or wishes that the other lacked it"
 Pride – inflated sense of one's personal status or accomplishments, often used synonymously with hubris.
 Vanity – excessive belief in one's own abilities or attractiveness to others.

Harmful traits and practices

 Abjection
 Abnormal psychology
 Bias
 Crime
 Deception
 Dysfunctional family
 Existential crisis
 Failure
 Grandiosity
 Hubris
 Hypocrisy
 Identity crisis
 Ignorance
 Impostor syndrome
 Narcissism
 Pessimism
 Risk
 Self-abasement
 Self-absorbed
 Self-abuse
 Self-blame
 Self-criticism
 Self-deception
 Self-deprecation
 Self-envy
 Self-estrangement
 Self-handicapping
 Self-harm
 Self-hatred
 Self-immolation
 Self-loathing
 Self-pity
 Self-propaganda
 Self-punishment
 Self-righteousness
 Self-serving
 Self-victimization
 Selfism
 Sexual self-objectification
 Stress
 Suicide

Personal experience

Personal life 

Personal life

Stages of life 

1. Infancy
2. Childhood
3. Adolescence
4. Adulthood
5. Middle age
6. Old age

Major life events 

1. Birth
2. Education
3. Graduation
4. Coming of age
5. Employment
6. Marriage
7. Parenthood
8. Retirement
9. Death

Self-actualization 

Self-actualization –
 Action
 Competence
 Effectiveness
 Efficacy
 Success

Maturity 
Self-management –
 Autodidacticism (self-education)
 Goal
 Goal setting
  Decision making
 Etiquette
 Intention
 Motivation
 Personal budget
 Personal development
 Personal finance
 Problem solving
 Self-actualization
 Self-assessment
 Self-awareness
Introspection
 Self-compassion
 Self-concealment
 Self-consciousness
 Self-control
 Self-defense
 Self-development
 Self-discipline
 Self-disclosure
 Self-discovery
 Self-efficacy
 Self-enhancement
 Self-estimated
 Self-gratification
 Self-help
 Self-interest
 Self-justification
 Self-knowledge
 Self-love
 Self-monitoring
 Self-reflection
 Self-regulated learning
 Self-respect
 Self-sufficiency
 Self-verification
 Stress management
 Time management

Self-preservation and self-maintenance 
 Enlightened self-interest
 Health
 Housekeeping
 Life extension
 Personal hygiene
 Personal safety
 Physical fitness
 Self-care
 Self-preservation
 Well-being

Individual rights 

Individual rights – much of the western world values the concept of individual rights. These rights vary from culture to culture, and by very definition, from person to person, and appear mainly in individualist societies. In considering the self, the most intimate legal relation would be what is codified as 'sui juris', or what laws have a purposed place so far as they are derived of the self.  In such cultures, it is generally considered that each and every individual has the following rights:
Security rights – protect people against crimes such as abuse, murder, massacre, and torture
 Security of person – liberty, including the right, if one is imprisoned unlawfully, to the remedy of habeas corpus. Security of person can also be seen as an expansion of rights based on prohibitions of torture and cruel and unusual punishment. Rights to security of person can guard against less lethal conduct, and can be used in regard to prisoners' rights.
 Bodily and property rights – encompass "ownership" of your own body and choosing what to do with it, as well as the fruits of the labour that spring forth from using your own body. ("Every man has a property in his own person. This nobody has a right to, but himself," per John Locke, Second Treatise on Civil Government)
 Self-ownership – moral or natural right of a person to have bodily integrity, and be the exclusive controller of his own body and life. Also known as "sovereignty of the individual", "individual sovereignty", and "individual autonomy".
Liberty rights of the Classical era – protect freedoms in areas such as belief and religion, association, assembling, movement, and other self-determination (as an individual person), privacy from government and others, and freedoms from other paternalist meddling generally, whether by governments or others; also encompasses security, bodily and property, political, and due process rights, many group rights, some welfare rights, and (especially outside of the US in the Classical era) equality rights, as all of those categories appear in this list
Political rights – protect the liberty to participate in politics by expressing themselves, protesting, voting and serving in public office
Due process rights – protect against abuses of the legal system such as imprisonment without trial, secret trials and excessive punishments; often overlaps with the bodily rights, listed above
Equality rights – guarantee equal citizenship, equality before the law and nondiscrimination in regards to one's eligibility for all of the other rights in this list
Welfare rights (also known as economic or social rights) – require the provision of education and protections against severe poverty and starvation; generally an expansion of positive liberties
Group rights – provide protection for groups against ethnic genocide, and self-determination (as a group) and the ownership by countries of their national territories and resources; may overlap with the bodily and property rights, and Social equality rights, listed above

Other personal concepts 
 Ability
 Aptitude
 Attitude
 Behavior
 Competence
 Character traits
 Chronotype
 Early bird
 Night owl
 Common sense
 Communication skills
 Duty
 Everyday life
 Egocentrism
 Egoism
 Emotional intelligence
 Ethics
 Good and evil
 Freedom (philosophy)
 Freedom (political)
 Free will
 Harm principle
 Human sexual behavior
 Human sexuality
 Humanism
 Improvement
 Individualism
 Individuality
 Individuation
 Interest (disambiguation)
 Intrapersonal communication
 Justice
 Liberty
 Lifestyle (List)
 Lifestyle disease
 Luck
 Meaning of life
 Morality
 Occupational disease
 Ownership
 Parenting
 People skills
 Personal boundaries
 Personal income
 Personal life
 Note-taking
 Personal property
 Personal space
 Personal time
 Philosophy
 Privacy
 Property
 Proxemics
 Psychological stress
 Public
 Reputation
 Self-talk
 Self-schema
 Self-worth
 Social influence
 Social intelligence
 Soft skills
 Study skills
 Subjectivity
 Success
 Taste (aesthetics)
 Taste (sociology)
 Temperament
 Thought
 Transhumanism

See also

 Collaboration
 Cosmos
 Cosmology 
 Externality
 List of cognitive biases
 Outline of social science
 Rite of passage
 Social behavior
 Trade-off

Self
Self
Self